Robert Pierce Knowles I (February 25, 1916November 3, 1985) was an American businessman and Republican politician.  He served 22 years in the Wisconsin State Senate (1955–1977), representing several counties in western Wisconsin.  He was the younger brother of Wisconsin Governor Warren P. Knowles (1965–1971).

Biography

Born in River Falls, Wisconsin, Knowles served in the United States Army Air Forces during World War II. He then graduated from the University of Wisconsin–River Falls. He was in the insurance and real estate business. Knowles served in the Wisconsin State Senate from 1955 until 1975; his older brother was Warren P. Knowles, the 37th Governor of Wisconsin. Knowles was defeated for re election in 1976 by Democrat Michele Radosevich 52%-48%.

Notes

People from River Falls, Wisconsin
United States Army Air Forces soldiers
Military personnel from Wisconsin
University of Wisconsin–River Falls alumni
Businesspeople from Wisconsin
Republican Party Wisconsin state senators
1916 births
1985 deaths
20th-century American businesspeople
20th-century American politicians